Serang virus (SERV) is a single-stranded, negative-sense, enveloped, novel RNA orthohantavirus.

Natural reservoir 
SERV was first isolated from the Asian house rat (R.Tanezumi) in Serang, Indonesia in 2008.

Virology 

Phylogenetic analysis based on partial L, M and S segment nucleotide sequences show SERV is novel and distinct among the hantaviruses. It is most closely related to Thailand virus (THAIV) which is carried by the great bandicoot rat (Bandicota indica). Nucleotide sequence comparison suggests that SERV is the result of cross-species transmission from bandicoots to Asian rats.

See also 
 Hantavirus hemorrhagic fever with renal syndrome
 Seoul virus

References

External links 
  Serang virus strain details
 

Viral diseases
Hantaviridae
Zoonoses
Hemorrhagic fevers
Rodent-carried diseases
Serang